ODR, or Odr may refer to:

Octal data rate, a technique used in high-speed computer memory
Oculomotor delayed response, a task used in neuroscience.
Óðr
Office for dispute resolution
On Demand Routing
One Day Remains
One Definition Rule
One-drop rule
Online dispute resolution 
Operator Driven Reliability - A field maintenance concept which is implemented in ODR programs
Orthogonal distance regression
Outdoor ice rink
Owner-driven reconstruction, in natural disaster recovery